Magdanly District   is a former district of Lebap Province in Turkmenistan. The administrative center of the district was the town of Magdanly. The district was abolished, and its territory transferred to Köýtendag District.

Districts of Turkmenistan
Lebap Region